Kozły may refer to the following places:
Kozły, Lublin Voivodeship (east Poland)
Kozły, Białystok County in Podlaskie Voivodeship (north-east Poland)
Kozły, Bielsk County in Podlaskie Voivodeship (north-east Poland)
Kozły, Masovian Voivodeship (east-central Poland)
Kozły, Greater Poland Voivodeship (west-central Poland)